Seth Rockman is an American historian. He is an associate professor of history at Brown University. He is the recipient of the Merle Curti Award and the Philip Taft Labor History Book Award for his 2009 book Scraping By: Wage Labor, Slavery, and Survival in Early Baltimore.

Biography 
Rockman was born in Indiana and raised in San Francisco. He received his B.A. from Columbia University and his Ph.D. from the University of California, Davis. He taught at Occidental College before joining the Brown University faculty in 2004. His scholarship has focused on the history of slavery and capitalism in the United States.

In 2010, Rockman was the co-winner of the Merle Curti Award from the Organization of American Historians. He also received the 2010 Philip Taft Labor History Book Award from the Cornell University ILR School.

Personal life 
Rockman is married to fellow Brown historian Tara Nummedal.

References 

Living people
American historians
Columbia College (New York) alumni
University of California, Davis alumni
Occidental College faculty
Brown University faculty
Historians of slavery
Year of birth missing (living people)